The Blake class was a pair of first-class protected cruisers, the very first of their rank in the Royal Navy, designed in the late 1880s and built around 1890.

Design

The Blakes were designed under the supervision of William White, shortly after he had become Director of Naval Construction. They were planned to combine the role of trade protection with the ability to operate with the fleet when required. As such, the design requirement combined high speed and long range. Unlike the preceding class of large cruisers in the Royal Navy, the Orlandos (which were 'belted' or armoured cruisers), the new class were protected cruisers, with protection afforded to their vital internal spaces by a full-length armoured deck, with no vertical armour belt fitted. They were also the ships for which the 'first-class cruiser' designation was created by the Royal Navy. This was due to their superlative nature, being much larger, faster and more powerful than any preceding design. All existing cruisers in the Royal Navy were re-rated in light of this new designation.

Main gun armament was similar to that of the Orlandos, consisting of two  Mark VI breech loading guns mounted in single mounts fore and aft on the ship's centreline, and ten single 6 in (152 mm) QF guns, all on broadside, of which six were sited on the ships' upper deck (with light open-backed gunshields) and the remaining four were mounted in armoured casemates on the ships' main deck. This dispersed arrangement was chosen to minimise the risk of one shell hit disabling multiple guns at once, a feature seen also in the contemporary Royal Sovereign-class battleships (which the Blake class were essentially cruiser counterparts of).
Secondary armament consisted of sixteen 3 pounder guns. Four 14 inch torpedo tubes completed the ships' armament, with two submerged tubes and two above the waterline.

The 9.2 inch guns were behind large, curved -armoured gunshields while the casemates protecting the main deck 6 inch guns were 6 inches thick.

Machinery consisted of 4 three-cylinder triple expansion engines fed by six double-ended cylindrical boilers and driving two shafts.

Service

The two ships were obsolete by the outbreak of the First World War, and served as depot ships. HMS Blenheim had the more active career, supporting the Mediterranean Expeditionary Force at the Battle of Gallipoli, and repatriating three dignitaries to their home countries after their deaths abroad. They were Prince Henry of Battenberg and former Canadian Prime Ministers Sir John Thompson and Sir Charles Tupper.

Building Programme

The following table gives the build details and purchase cost of the members of the Blake class.  Standard British practice at that time was for these costs to exclude armament and stores.

See also 
 Carlos V: a spanish armored cruiser inspired design by Blake-class cruiser

Notes

References
 Brassey, T.A. (ed) The Naval Annual 1895
 Brown, D.K. Warrior to Dreadnought: Warship Development 1860–1905. London: Caxton Editions, 1997. .

Chesnau, Roger and Kolesnik, Eugene (Ed.) Conway's All the World's Fighting Ships 1860–1905. Conway Maritime Press, 1979.

External links

 
Cruiser classes
Ship classes of the Royal Navy